Kobylisy is a district in the north of Prague, located in Prague 8. The eastern part of the district is home to a large panel housing estate with over 10,000 residents. The area is served by Kobylisy and Ládví stations on the Prague Metro, both of which opened in 2004.

History 
May 27, 1942, a successful assassination of Reinhard Heydrich during the Operation Anthropoid.
During World War II people were executed in Kobylisy Shooting Range

Other photos

Neighbouring districts

Districts of Prague